Forestville is a CDP in Shenandoah County, in the U.S. state of Virginia.

The Forestville Historic District was listed on the National Register of Historic Places in 2011.

References

Census-designated places in Shenandoah County, Virginia
Census-designated places in Virginia